Anacampsis meibomiella is a moth of the family Gelechiidae. It was described by William Trowbridge Merrifield Forbes in 1931. It is found in Puerto Rico and Cuba.

References

Moths described in 1931
Anacampsis
Moths of the Caribbean